Mammea africana is a medium to large sized tree within the family Calophyllaceae, it is also known as African mammee apple and its timber is traded under the trade name, Oboto. Mammea africana is found in evergreen and semi deciduous forests in West and Central Tropical Africa.

Description
A medium to large sized tree that can grow up to 40 meters tall with a dark green crown of short spreading branches, it has a cylindrical and straight trunk, that can be up to 27 meters tall without branches. Leaves are simple, coriaceous and thick, the upper surface is glossy dark green while beneath is less shiny and glabrous, the petiole is 0.4–1.5 cm long; leaf-blade is elliptical to oblong in outline, 12–26 cm long and 4–10 cm wide. Flower is axillary on leafy shoots  and cauliflorous, with buds that are globular; pedicel is up to 4 cm long, petals are 4, white and caducous, up to 3 cm long.

Distribution
Occurs in from Sierra Leone, eastwards to Angola and the Democratic Republic of the Congo.

Chemistry
Test on stem bark extracts of Mammea africana identified the presence of coumarin derivatives many identified in Mammea americana, such as mammea A/AA, mammea B/BB and mammea A/AB, the compounds showed inhibitory effects on microbial activity but also indicated moderate cytotoxicity of a human cell line.

Uses
Extracts of the species are used to treat fever, stomach pains and skin infections such as scabies. Wood is used for local carpentry work, piling and joinery. The fruit is edible though fibrous, it is eaten by locals.

References

Flora of West Tropical Africa
africana